National Highway 703A, commonly referred to as NH 703A is a national highway in  India. It is a spur road of National Highway 3. NH-703A traverses the state of Punjab in India.

Route 
Jalandhar - Kapurthala - Sultanpur Lodhi - Pindi - Makhu - Maluwalia Wala - Mallanwala - Ilmewala - Arifke

Junctions  

  Terminal near Jalandhar.
  near Makhu.
  near Makhu.
  Terminal near Arifke.

See also 

 List of National Highways in India
 List of National Highways in India by state

References

External links 

 NH 703A on OpenStreetMap
{
  "type": "FeatureCollection",
  "features": [
    {
      "type": "Feature",
      "properties": {},
      "geometry": {
        "type": "LineString",
        "coordinates": [
          [
            75.205068110372,
            31.167730102989
          ],
          [
            75.216140267876,
            31.168963912945
          ],
          [
            75.227160930372,
            31.169463307217
          ]
        ]
      }
    },
    {
      "type": "Feature",
      "properties": {},
      "geometry": {
        "type": "LineString",
        "coordinates": [
          [
            75.227178096247,
            31.169426587676
          ],
          [
            75.238250256371,
            31.169823164137
          ]
        ]
      }
    },
    {
      "type": "Feature",
      "properties": {},
      "geometry": {
        "type": "LineString",
        "coordinates": [
          [
            75.238181591558,
            31.169808475817
          ],
          [
            75.247880458046,
            31.170116923325
          ]
        ]
      }
    },
    {
      "type": "Feature",
      "properties": {},
      "geometry": {
        "type": "LineString",
        "coordinates": [
          [
            75.247846126294,
            31.170116923325
          ],
          [
            75.254025935865,
            31.1705575604
          ]
        ]
      }
    },
    {
      "type": "Feature",
      "properties": {},
      "geometry": {
        "type": "LineString",
        "coordinates": [
          [
            75.254008769989,
            31.170660374974
          ],
          [
            75.256824016833,
            31.17659408167
          ]
        ]
      }
    },
    {
      "type": "Feature",
      "properties": {},
      "geometry": {
        "type": "LineString",
        "coordinates": [
          [
            75.25682830601,
            31.176986955057
          ],
          [
            75.264930725098,
            31.205122819216
          ]
        ]
      }
    },
    {
      "type": "Feature",
      "properties": {},
      "geometry": {
        "type": "LineString",
        "coordinates": [
          [
            75.26462173671463,
            31.20557797556783
          ],
          [
            75.25948047637941,
            31.238943426847317
          ]
        ]
      }
    }
  ]
}

National highways in India
National Highways in Punjab, India
Transport in Jalandhar